List of Registered Historic Places in Bronx County, New York (Borough of The Bronx):

This is intended to be a complete list of the 76 properties and districts listed on the National Register of Historic Places in Bronx County, New York. The locations of National Register properties and districts (at least for all showing latitude and longitude coordinates below) may be seen in a map by clicking on "Map of all coordinates". Seven of the properties and districts are further designated National Historic Landmarks.



Current listings

|}

See also

 Statewide: National Register of Historic Places listings in New York
 Citywide: Manhattan, Queens, Staten Island, Brooklyn
 List of New York City Designated Landmarks in The Bronx

References

External links
A useful list of the above sites, with street addresses and other information, is available at Bronx County listing, at National Register of Historic Places.Com, a private site serving up public domain information on NRHPs.

Bronx

Buildings and structures in the Bronx
Bronx
Bronx-related lists